The men's 800 metres at the 2014 IPC Athletics European Championships was held at the Swansea University Stadium from 18–23 August. There were only final events taken place; no heats events were contested.

Medalists

Results

T34

T36

T38

T53

T54

See also
List of IPC world records in athletics

References

800 metres
800 metres at the World Para Athletics European Championships